Moths of Senegal represent about 190 known moth species. The moths (mostly nocturnal) and butterflies (mostly diurnal) together make up the taxonomic order Lepidoptera.

This is a list of moth species which have been recorded in Senegal.

Arctiidae
Acantharctia lacteata Rothschild, 1933
Acantharctia nivea Aurivillius, 1900
Afrowatsonius marginalis (Walker, 1855)
Aloa moloneyi (Druce, 1887)
Alpenus affiniola (Strand, 1919)
Alpenus maculosa (Stoll, 1781)
Amata lateralis (Boisduval, 1836)
Amerila fennia (Druce, 1887)
Amerila pannosa (Grünberg, 1908)
Amerila puella (Fabricius, 1793)
Amerila vitrea Plötz, 1880
Apisa subcanescens Rothschild, 1910
Automolis subulva (Mabille, 1884)
Epilacydes scita (Walker, 1865)
Estigmene flaviceps Hampson, 1907
Estigmene laglaizei Rothschild, 1910
Estigmene senegalensis Rothschild, 1933
Estigmene testaceoflava Rothschild, 1933
Estigmene unilinea Rothschild, 1910
Euchromia folletii (Guérin-Méneville, 1832)
Euchromia lethe (Fabricius, 1775)
Logunovium nigricosta (Holland, 1893)
Micralarctia punctulatum (Wallengren, 1860)
Spilosoma castelli Rothschild, 1933
Spilosoma occidens (Rothschild, 1910)
Spilosoma quadrilunata (Hampson, 1901)
Spilosoma rava (Druce, 1898)
Teracotona rhodophaea (Walker, 1865)
Teracotona senegalensis Rothschild, 1933
Thyretes negus Oberthür, 1878
Trichaeta parva Aurivillius, 1910
Utetheisa pulchella (Linnaeus, 1758)

Cosmopterigidae
Anatrachyntis risbeci (Ghesquière, 1940)
Cosmopterix luteoapicalis Sinev, 2002

Cossidae
Azygophleps psyche Le Cerf, 1919
Eremocossus senegalensis Le Cerf, 1919

Crambidae
Euclasta varii Popescu-Gorj & Constantinescu, 1973
Nomophila noctuella ([Denis & Schiffermüller], 1775)
Pleuroptya balteata (Fabricius, 1798)
Synclera traducalis (Zeller, 1852)

Drepanidae
Negera natalensis (Felder, 1874)

Geometridae
Erastria albosignata (Walker, 1863)
Euproutia aggravaria (Guenée, 1858)
Idaea prionodonta (Prout, 1932)
Isturgia inaequivirgaria (Mabille, 1890)
Neromia propinquilinea Prout, 1920
Orbamia octomaculata (Wallengren, 1872)
Orbamia renimacula (Prout, 1926)
Scopula paradelpharia Prout, 1920
Thalassodes albifimbria Warren, 1897
Zamarada acrochra Prout, 1928
Zamarada anacantha D. S. Fletcher, 1974
Zamarada bicuspida D. S. Fletcher, 1974
Zamarada crystallophana Mabille, 1900
Zamarada dilucida Warren, 1909
Zamarada emaciata D. S. Fletcher, 1974
Zamarada euerces Prout, 1928
Zamarada nasuta Warren, 1897
Zygophyxia relictata (Walker, 1866)

Gracillariidae
Stomphastis thraustica (Meyrick, 1908)

Lasiocampidae
Beralade bistrigata Strand, 1909
Chrysopsyche imparilis Aurivillius, 1905
Euphorea ondulosa (Conte, 1909)
Lasiocampa bilineata (Mabille, 1884)
Leipoxais proboscidea (Guérin-Méneville, 1832)
Mimopacha rotundata Hering, 1941
Pallastica meloui (Riel, 1909)
Streblote bakeri (Riel, 1911)
Theophasida cardinalli (Tams, 1926)

Lecithoceridae
Torodora hybrista (Meyrick, 1922)

Limacodidae
Latoia colini Mabille, 1881
Latoia privativa Hering, 1928

Lymantriidae
Aroa achrodisca Hampson, 1910
Dasychira colini (Mabille, 1893)

Metarbelidae
Kroonia carteri Lehmann, 2010
Lebedodes wichgrafi (Grünberg, 1910)
Salagena discata Gaede, 1929
Salagena inversa Gaede, 1929
Salagena nigropuncta Le Cerf, 1919

Noctuidae
Acantholipes aurea Berio, 1966
Acantholipes semiaurea Berio, 1966
Achaea catella Guenée, 1852
Acontia basifera Walker, 1857
Acontia buchanani (Rothschild, 1921)
Acontia citrelinea Bethune-Baker, 1911
Acontia fastrei Hacker, Legrain & Fibiger, 2010
Acontia hampsoni Hacker, Legrain & Fibiger, 2008
Acontia imitatrix Wallengren, 1856
Acontia insocia (Walker, 1857)
Acontia porphyrea (Butler, 1898)
Acontia stassarti Hacker, Legrain & Fibiger, 2010
Acontia transfigurata Wallengren, 1856
Acontia wahlbergi Wallengren, 1856
Aegocera rectilinea Boisduval, 1836
Agoma trimenii (Felder, 1874)
Amazonides tabida (Guenée, 1852)
Aspidifrontia hemileuca (Hampson, 1909)
Aspidifrontia senegalensis Berio, 1966
Aspidifrontia villiersi (Laporte, 1972)
Audea paulumnodosa Kühne, 2005
Brevipecten calimanii (Berio, 1939)
Calliodes appollina Guenée, 1852
Cerocala albicornis Berio, 1966
Chasmina tibialis (Fabricius, 1775)
Chasmina vestae (Guenée, 1852)
Clytie tropicalis Rungs, 1975
Crypsotidia maculifera (Staudinger, 1898)
Crypsotidia mesosema Hampson, 1913
Crypsotidia remanei Wiltshire, 1977
Ctenusa pallida (Hampson, 1902)
Dysmilichia flavonigra (Swinhoe, 1884)
Euclidia limbosa Guenée, 1852
Gesonia nigripalpa Wiltshire, 1977
Gnamptonyx innexa (Walker, 1858)
Helicoverpa assulta (Guenée, 1852)
Hypena obacerralis Walker, [1859]
Hypotacha isthmigera Wiltshire, 1968
Iambia jansei Berio, 1966
Masalia albiseriata (Druce, 1903)
Masalia bimaculata (Moore, 1888)
Masalia cheesmanae Seymour, 1972
Masalia decorata (Moore, 1881)
Masalia flaviceps (Hampson, 1903)
Masalia galatheae (Wallengren, 1856)
Masalia nubila (Hampson, 1903)
Masalia rubristria (Hampson, 1903)
Masalia terracottoides (Rothschild, 1921)
Matopo selecta (Walker, 1865)
Melanephia nigrescens (Wallengren, 1856)
Misa memnonia Karsch, 1895
Mitrophrys magna (Walker, 1854)
Mitrophrys menete (Cramer, 1775)
Mocis mayeri (Boisduval, 1833)
Mythimna languida (Walker, 1858)
Ophiusa mejanesi (Guenée, 1852)
Ozarba corniculantis Berio, 1947
Ozarba leptocyma Hampson, 1914
Ozarba rubrivena Hampson, 1910
Pandesma muricolor Berio, 1966
Pericyma mendax (Walker, 1858)
Phaegorista agaristoides Boisduval, 1836
Phaegorista leucomelas (Herrich-Schäffer, 1855)
Plecopterodes moderata (Wallengren, 1860)
Polydesma umbricola Boisduval, 1833
Rhabdophera clathrum (Guenée, 1852)
Rhabdophera hansali (Felder & Rogenhofer, 1874)
Rhynchina leucodonta Hampson, 1910
Saalmuellerana media (Walker, 1857)
Schausia gladiatoria (Holland, 1893)
Spodoptera exempta (Walker, 1857)
Thiacidas kanoensis Hacker & Zilli, 2007
Thiacidas meii Hacker & Zilli, 2007
Thiacidas mukim (Berio, 1977)
Thiacidas stassarti Hacker & Zilli, 2007
Thiacidas submutata Hacker & Zilli, 2007
Thyas parallelipipeda (Guenée, 1852)
Timora senegalensis (Guenée, 1852)

Nolidae
Blenina chloromelana (Mabille, 1890)

Notodontidae
Anaphe stellata Guérin-Méneville, 1844
Epanaphe vuilleti (de Joannis, 1907)

Psychidae
Eumeta rotunda Bourgogne, 1965
Melasina murifica Meyrick, 1922

Pyralidae
Pempelia morosalis (Saalmüller, 1880)

Saturniidae
Bunaeopsis hersilia (Westwood, 1849)
Epiphora bauhiniae (Guérin-Méneville, 1832)
Gonimbrasia occidentalis Rothschild, 1907
Holocerina angulata (Aurivillius, 1893)
Imbrasia senegalensis (Olivier, 1792)
Micragone nenia (Westwood, 1849)
Micragone nenioides Rougeot, 1979
Pseudimbrasia deyrollei (J. Thomson, 1858)
Pseudobunaea irius (Fabricius, 1793)

Sesiidae
Metasphecia vuilleti Le Cerf, 1917

Sphingidae
Leucophlebia afra Karsch, 1891
Neopolyptychus spurrelli (Rothschild & Jordan, 1912)
Nephele accentifera (Palisot de Beauvois, 1821)
Nephele peneus (Cramer, 1776)
Platysphinx phyllis Rothschild & Jordan, 1903
Pseudoclanis boisduvali (Aurivillius, 1898)
Pseudoclanis molitor (Rothschild & Jordan, 1912)
Pseudoclanis rhadamistus (Fabricius, 1781)
Rufoclanis rosea (Druce, 1882)
Theretra perkeo Rothschild & Jordan, 1903

Thyrididae
Amalthocera tiphys Boisduval, 1836

Tineidae
Agnathosia byrsinopa (Meyrick, 1933)
Ceratophaga tragoptila (Meyrick, 1917)
Endromarmata lutipalpis (Meyrick, 1922)
Hapsifera luteata Gozmány, 1965
Hapsifera niphoxantha Gozmány, 1965
Syncalipsis optania (Meyrick, 1908)

Tortricidae
Eccopsis wahlbergiana Zeller, 1852

References

External links 

African Moths

Senegal
Moths
Senegal
Senegal